is a former Japanese football player.

Playing career
Suzuki was born in Shizuoka Prefecture on June 16, 1981. He joined J1 League club Shimizu S-Pulse based in his local from youth team in 2000. However he could not play at all in the match until 2000. In 2002, he moved to J2 League club Ventforet Kofu with Yusuke Yoshizaki. However he could not play many matches and retired end of 2002 season.

Club statistics

References

External links

1981 births
Living people
Association football people from Shizuoka Prefecture
Japanese footballers
J1 League players
J2 League players
Shimizu S-Pulse players
Ventforet Kofu players
Association football forwards